Judith Eisenstein ( Kaplan; September 10, 1909 – February 14, 1996) was an author, musicologist, composer, theologian and the first person to celebrate a bat mitzvah publicly in America (see below).

Life 
The bat mitzvah was created to address Judaism's gender imbalance and is the female equivalent of a boy's bar mitzvah, signifying  entrance into religious majority. Judith, the
eldest of four daughters born to Lena ( Rubin) and Rabbi Mordecai Kaplan (who was the founder of the Reconstructionist branch of Judaism), was the first person to celebrate a bat mitzvah publicly in America, which she did on March 18, 1922, aged 12, at her father’s synagogue the Society for the Advancement of Judaism in New York City. 

Kaplan recited the preliminary blessing, read a portion of that week's Torah portion in Hebrew and English, and then intoned the closing blessing. Her bat mitzvah was the first time that a woman led the congregation; as such it represents a significant shift for Judaism in America. Until this time women did not engage in  public reading of the Torah and a Jewish girl's transition from child to adult was not reflected in synagogue ceremonies.

Reflecting on the ceremony many years later she said: "No thunder sounded. No lightning struck." "It all passed very peacefully." Bat mitzvah ceremonies are now commonplace within the Conservative, Reform and Reconstructionist branches of Judaism. At the age of 82, Kaplan had a second bat mitzvah. Various feminist and Jewish leaders, including Betty Friedan, Letty Cottin Pogrebin, Ruth W. Messinger, and Elizabeth Holtzman were present.

During her life she was an author, theologian, musicologist and composer. She earned bachelor's and master's degrees from Columbia University and studied at the Institute of Musical Art, now the Juilliard School. She published a book of children's music, Gateway to Jewish Song, and a number of cantatas on Jewish themes, including the popular "What Is Torah," with her husband, Rabbi Ira Eisenstein whom she married in 1934. Her  translations of Hebrew songs are now enjoyed by Jewish children throughout the US.  She taught music education and the history of Jewish music at the Albert A. List College of Jewish Studies from 1929 to 1954. She taught at School of Sacred Music of Hebrew Union College-Jewish Institute of Religion in New York from 1966 to 1979.

Death
Judith Kaplan Eisenstein died on February 14, 1996, aged 86, in Silver Spring, Maryland. Her papers are included in the Ira and Judith Kaplan Eisenstein Reconstructionist Archives of the Reconstructionist Rabbinical College.

Selected works 
 
 
 
 
 
 
 
 Shir ha-shahar [Song of the Dawn] (1974)

External Link 
Drama telling the story of her bas mitzvah as if she had an Instagram account

References 

Jewish-American history
1909 births
1996 deaths
People from Columbia, Maryland
Jewish American musicians
American women non-fiction writers
20th-century American women musicians
20th-century American non-fiction writers
Reconstructionist Jewish feminists
American Reconstructionist Jews